The chain is a unit of length equal to 66 feet (22 yards), used in both the US customary and Imperial unit systems. It is subdivided into 100 links or 4 rods. There are 10 chains in a furlong, and 80 chains in one statute mile. In metric terms, it is 20.1168 m long. By extension, chainage (running distance) is the distance along a curved or straight survey line from a fixed commencing point, as given by an odometer. 

The chain has been used for several centuries in England and in some other countries influenced by English practice. In the United Kingdom, there were 80 chains to the mile, but until the early nineteenth century the Scottish and Irish customary miles were longer than the statute mile; consequently a Scots chain was about 74 (imperial) feet, an Irish chain 84 feet. These longer chains became obsolete following the adoption of the imperial system of units in 1824.

In India, "metric chains" of exactly 20metres (and fractions thereof) are used.

Definition
This unit is a statute measure in the United Kingdom, defined in the Weights and Measures Act 1985.

Origin
The surveyor's chain was first mentioned 1579 and appears in an illustration in 1607. In 1593 the English mile was redefined by a statute of Queen Elizabeth I as 5,280 feet, to tie in with agricultural practice. In 1620, the polymath Edmund Gunter developed a method of accurately surveying land using a surveyor's chain 66 feet long with 100 links. The 66 feet unit, which was four perches or rods, took on the name the chain. By 1675 it was accepted, and Ogilby wrote:

From Gunter's system, the chain and the link became standard surveyors' units of length and crossed to the colonies. The thirteen states of America were expanding westward and the public land had to be surveyed for a cadastral. In 1784 Thomas Jefferson wrote a report for the Continental Congress proposing the rectangular survey system; it was adopted with some changes as the Land Ordinance of 1785 on 20 May the following year. In the report, the use of the chain as a unit of measurement was mandated, and the chain was defined.

Modern use and historic cultural references

United Kingdom

In the United Kingdom, the chain is no longer used for practical survey work. However, it survives on the railways as a location identifier. When railways were designed, the location of features such as bridges and stations was indicated by a cumulative longitudinal "mileage", using miles and chains, from a zero point at the origin or headquarters of the railway, or the originating junction of a new branch line. Since railways are linear in topology, the "mileage" or "chainage" is sufficient to identify a place uniquely on any given route. Thus, a given bridge location may be indicated as 112 miles and 63 chains (181.51 km) from the origin. In the case of the photograph, the bridge is near Keynsham, which is that distance from London Paddington station. The indication "MLN" after the mileage is the engineers' line reference describing the route as the Great Western Main Line, which is needed to uniquely determine the bridge, as there may be points at 112 miles 63 chains on other routes.

On new railway lines built in the United Kingdom such as High Speed 1, the position along the alignment is still called "chainage" although the value is now expressed in metres.

North America
The use of the chain was mandatory in laying out US townships. A federal law was passed in 1785 (the Public Land Survey Ordinance) that all official government surveys must be done with a Gunter's (surveyor's) chain. Chains and links are commonly encountered in older metes and bounds legal descriptions. Distances on township plat maps made by the US General Land Office are shown in chains.

Under the US Public Land Survey System, parcels of land are often described in terms of the section, quarter-section, and quarter-quarter-section. Respectively, these square divisions of land are approximately 80 chains (one mile or 1.6 km), 40 chains (half a mile or 800 m), and 20 chains (a quarter mile or 400 m) on a side.

The chain is still used in agriculture: measuring wheels with a circumference of 0.1 chain (diameter ≈ 2.1 ft or 64 cm) are still readily available in Canada and the United States. For a rectangular tract, multiplying the number of turns of a chain wheel for each of two adjacent sides and dividing by 1,000 gives the area in acres.

In Canada, road allowances were originally 1 chain wide and are now 20 metres.

The unit was also used in mapping the United States along train routes in the 19th century. Railroads in the United States have long since  used decimal fractions of a mile. Some subways such as the New York City Subway and the Washington Metro were designed with and continue with a chaining system using the 100-foot engineer's chain.

In the United States, the chain is also used as the measure of the rate of spread of wildfires (chains per hour), both in the predictive National Fire Danger Rating System as well as in after-action reports. The term chain is used by wildland firefighters in day-to-day operations as a unit of distance.

Australia and New Zealand
In Australia and New Zealand, most building lots in the past were a quarter of an acre, measuring one chain by two and a half chains, and other lots would be multiples or fractions of a chain. Laneways would be half a chain (10.1 m). In rural areas the roads were wider, up to  where a stock route was required.  roads were surveyed as major roads or highways between larger towns,  roads between smaller localities, and  roads were local roads in farming communities. Roads named Three Chain Road etc. persist today.

The "Queen's Chain" is a concept that has long existed in New Zealand, of a strip of public land, usually 20 metres (or one chain in pre-metric measure) wide from the high water mark, that has been set aside for public use along the coast, around many lakes, and along all or part of many rivers. These strips exist in various forms (including road reserves, esplanade reserves, esplanade strips, marginal strips and reserves of various types) but not as extensively and consistently as is often assumed.

Cricket pitches
The chain also survives as the length of a cricket pitch, being the distance between the stumps.

Measuring instruments
Civil engineers and surveyors use various instruments including chains to measure distance. Other instruments used for measuring distance include tapes and bands. A steel band is also known as a "band chain".

Surveyors' chain (Gunter's chain) 

 
In 1620, the polymath Edmund Gunter developed a method of accurately surveying land using a 100 link chain, 66 feet long called the Gunter's Chain. Other surveyors chains have been used historically.

Engineer's chain (Ramsden's chain)

Surveyors also sometimes used such a device, and called it the engineer's chain.

or Texas chain
In the Southwestern United States, the  chain also called the Texas chain, of 20  (16.9164 m , or  ft) was used in surveying Spanish and later Mexican land grants, such as the major Fisher–Miller and Paisano Grants in Texas, several similarly large ones in New Mexico, and over 200 smaller  in California.

Metric chains
Metric chains, of lengths 5 m, 10 m, 20 m and 30 m, are widely used in India. Tolerances are +/- 3 mm for 5 m and 10 m chains, +/- 5 mm for a 20 m chain, and +/- 8 mm for a 30 m chain.

Revenue chain
In India, a revenue chain with 16 links and of length  is used in cadastral surveys.

Other instruments
Also in North America, a variant of the chain is used in forestry for traverse surveys. This modern chain is a static cord (thin rope) 50 metres long, marked with a small tag at each metre, and also marked in the first metre every decimetre. When working in dense bush, a short axe or hatchet is commonly tied to the end of the chain, and thrown through the bush in the direction of the traverse.

Another version used extensively in forestry and surveying is the hip-chain: a small box containing a string counter, worn on the hip. The user ties off the spooled string to a stake or tree and the counter tallies distance as the user walks away in a straight line. These instruments are available in both feet and metres.

Use in popular culture
The lyrics of Three Chain Road, by Lee Kernaghan, include the line "He lived out on the three chain road" which is the name of many Australian roads; referring to the width of the road reserve.

References

External links
Math Words

Units of length
Imperial units
Surveying
Customary units of measurement in the United States
Forestry tools